Abdul Rehman Veeri  Abdul Rehman Bhat is an Indian politician and the former member of the Jammu and Kashmir Legislative Assembly, who represented Bijbehara  constituency from 1999 to June 2018 until the coalition government was ended by the Bhartiya Janata Party and Jammu and Kashmir Peoples Democratic Party in the state.

Veeri is the current Vice-president at Jammu and Kashmir Peoples Democratic Party, and has served minister of state for Rural development, Panchayati raj and for Road and building (R&B).

References 

Living people
University of Kashmir alumni
People from Anantnag district
Jammu and Kashmir Peoples Democratic Party politicians
20th-century Indian politicians
21st-century Indian politicians
Kashmiri people
Year of birth missing (living people)